The 6th October Bridge is an elevated highway in central Cairo, Egypt. The  bridge and causeway crosses the Nile twice from the west bank suburbs, east through Gezira Island to Downtown Cairo, and on to connect the city to the Cairo International Airport to the east.

Its name commemorates the date of 'The Crossing', which commenced the outbreak day of the Yom Kippur War in 1973.

History
The bridge and causeway were completed in 1996, with construction taking nearly 30 years. It began in 1969 with the modest, -long Phase 1, which only spanned the smaller west branch of the Nile from Gezira to Agouza (built from May 1969 to August 1972). Phase 9 completed the -long final length in 2005. The '6th October Bridge and Flyover' runs from the Agricultural Museum in Dokki east to the Autostrade in Nasr City.

The building of the 6th October Bridge and causeway has been declared a national infrastructure project.

In April 2021, President Abdel Fattah el-Sisi gave the order to expand and upgrade the bridge, as well as the roads underneath it.

Public use
The 6th October Bridge has been called the 'spinal cord' of Cairo, with approximately half a million Cairene people using it on a daily basis. Due to its role as Cairo's central East–West automobile and truck route, the bridge and causeway is nearly always crowded with traffic, with the trip from one end to another taking up to 45 minutes.

Egyptian Revolution of 2011
During the Egyptian Revolution of 2011, the bridge had been a major route to the Tahrir Square democracy demonstrations, and also itself been the scene of violent confrontations between pro-Mubarak protesters and anti-Mubarak protesters.

Gallery

References

External links

Al-Ahram Weekly | "The final bridge" - history 
Structurae [en]: 6th of October Bridge (1996)

1996 establishments in Egypt
Bridges in Cairo
Bridges over the Nile
Downtown Cairo
Gezira Island
Bridges completed in 1996
Articles containing video clips